Julião Mateus Paulo is an Angolan politician and former Secretary-General of the People's Movement for the Liberation of Angola (MPLA). He is widely known by his wartime nom de guerre, Dino Matross.

He succeeded João Lourenço as MPLA Secretary-General at a December 2003 party congress.

Paulo was the fourth candidate on the MPLA's national list in the September 2008 parliamentary election. He won a seat in this election, in which MPLA won an overwhelming majority in the National Assembly.

References

Living people
Members of the National Assembly (Angola)
MPLA politicians
Governors of Benguela
State Security ministers of Angola
1942 births